VoizNoiz 3 is a 2002 album by Michel Banabila and Eric Vloeimans. The album's tracks contains a variety of sounds such as voices, street sounds, digital noise, and other samplings, which were centered on trumpet improvisations by Vloeimans.

History
Tracks from the album were used in two films, Petersburg, Places and Paintings and In Real Life, and in the compilation album Dubplates From The Lamp 3. Four tracks from the album were also released on vinyl.

Personnel 
Eric Vloeimans – trumpet
Michel Banabila – keys and electronics
Bobby – tapes and turntable 
Hans Greeve – drums and guitar             
Frank vd Kooy – sax and bassclarinet 
Guus Bakker – double bass             
Yasar Saka – voice-processing
Robin Schaeverbeke – cover photo

Track listing 
All tracks are composed by Banabila & Vloeimans, except "Cinematic Grooves", which was composed by Banabila, Vloeimans and Schaeverbeke.
 Tapes HV Rmxd (04:29)
 Vloeivoiz (03:36) 
 Damned (03:39) 
 Sneaky Creatures (07:15) 
 Rumbaah (04:05) 
 Cinematic Grooves (03:39)
 Blow Out (04:08) 
 A Virtual Meeting (04:36)
 Ring Modulation (04:54) 
 The Tapes From HV (04:13) 
 Roofscape (03:25)

References

External links 

 

2002 albums
Michel Banabila albums
Eric Vloeimans albums